Art collection was a common practice amongst the ancient Romans. Goods and artworks had symbolic meanings and were used to convey messages about the collector and the Roman state. Due to the popularity of collectable goods an art market sprouted up. These goods were managed at first by the aediles and censors, and later by the curatores aedium sacrarum et operum locorumque. Lists may also have been used to track goods.

Public collections 

Ancient Roman temples housed collections of famous sculptures. The aediles, who were political officials in ancient Rome, established art exhibitions for religious festivals. Museums were also used as political propaganda. Generals established buildings dedicated to showcasing their loot. For example, Gaius Asinius Pollio built the Atrium Libertatis, which was dedicated to celebrating his victories. Emperor Vespasian constructed the Temple of Peace which showcased the loot he gained from his war in Judea. Loot was also displayed in the Campus Martius. During sieges and battles, the Roman military performed a ritual known as evocatio. This practice was designed to divert the opposing's sides patron deities to the Roman side. As part of this practice, religious idols and statues may have been taken from the opposing culture to the Roman cities. It is also possible this was part of normal looting. Usually, looted objects were displayed in the capital city during a triumph. This was an important religious and political rite. It highlighted the achievements of the triumphing general.

Important historical and cultural sites were also maintained and put on display. The birthplace and house of Romulus were preserved and publicly displayed on the Palatine hill. It may have been located on the Capitoline Hill. However, this structure may have been a copy of the one on the Palatine hill. Emperors and generals commemorated their successes through the construction of monuments such as the Arch of Constantine, which were designed to publicly showcase the notability of a person's achievements. Through these forms of public display artworks gained new meaning. To the Romans, they were representative of the Roman state's triumph over their enemies. Another kind involved the creation of movable paintings. To create this, marble was inserted in niches in the stonework. Frescoes were used to decorate the walls of an oecus or cryptoporticus.

Private collections 
Aside from public spaces, Romans used their own houses as museums. They displayed artwork, usually Greek, in their atriums, libraries, banquets, halls, or gardens. It was considered a sign of high social status to have many visitors come to see the artwork in one's house. There were numerous methods of displaying works in ancient Rome. One method of displaying works was the Pinacothecae. It was a kind of picture gallery where paintings were painted on marble or wood panels. They became popular in the mid-1st century BCE. People, typically patricians, also held private collections for personal purposes. This type of collection may have originated from Alexandria and Pergamon. Like other styles of collection it was influenced by Greek culture.

Engraved gems

A popular, and conveniently portable, type of object collected was the engraved gem.  Many Greek and Hellenistic artists were very well-known and sought after. Famous collectors begin with King Mithridates VI of Pontus (d. 63 BC), whose collection was part of the booty of Pompey the Great, who donated it to the Temple of Jupiter in Rome. Julius Caesar was determined to excel Pompey in this as in other areas, and later gave six collections to his own Temple of Venus Genetrix; according to Suetonius gems were among his varied collecting passions. Many later emperors also collected gems. Chapters 4-6 of Book 37 of the Natural History of Pliny the Elder give a summary art history of the Greek and Roman tradition, and of Roman collecting.  According to Pliny Marcus Aemilius Scaurus, praetor in 56 BC, was the first Roman collector.

Cultural significance 

The objects the Romans liked to collect often had a symbolic purpose. Cicero viewed one's material possessions as an extension of oneself. Patricians would collect wax figures of their ancestors and use them to decorate their houses and during funeral services. Portraits of famous figures would also be collected. These artworks were status symbols and were used to showcase moral virtues. Collected objects often represented the past and the achievements and identity of Rome. Collections were used to convey messages about the collector and Roman society at large. Cicero described his political opponent, Verres, as an unvirtuous collector. Verres was described as a person obsessed with other's perceptions of himself, and with a lust for art pieces.

For Roman women, two stereotypes existed: The good, "honourable" women who were associated with "the house, piety and religion", who would only collect objects needed for "the adornments of the house, or religious practices." And on the other hand, the "frivolous, vain, time-wasting" women who would acquire "objects of personal adornment" in order to seduce men. Sometimes, women used the male population's desires for goods such as citron tables as a defense against accusations of extravagance in pearls.

Objects and artworks could become expensive and valuable due to the cultural significance attached to them. The art market expanded to allow for intentionally collectable goods and art pieces designed to follow cultural and artistic trends. Pliny the Elder uses the term insania to describe the populace's affinity for citron tables. Despite the name, these "citron" tables were likely actually made of the Tetraclinis tree. Pliny also describes how the orator Lucius Crassus had cups so valuable he had never used them. He was said to have paid 100,000 sesterces for two of these cups. Silverware were common materials to collect, and they were considered a sign of high social status, with one ex-consul spending 70,000 sesterces on a murrhine goblet. Other commonly collected materials included jewelry, carpets, books, and furniture. Artworks and goods were sold in areas such as the forum. Some Romans considered the love of goods and the desire to collect objects to be immoral. Agrippa, inspired by one of Cato's speeches, stated that artwork should not be held by private individuals but instead returned to the populace. The artist's signature was important for determining the value of an artwork. It was equivalent to a modern brand name. Forgers would fake signatures to inflate the price of an art piece. Merchants would sell goods under the pretense that they belonged to mythological or important cultural figures, such as if they were the clothes of Odysseus.

Administration 
Augustus established the curatores aedium sacrarum et operum locorumque publicorum, which was a group of two individuals tasked with managing architecture and public art. This organization's role was previously filled by the censors and the aediles. It is possible that artworks and artifacts were tracked with inventory lists of works in collections or on public display. These lists would have been called litterae publicae. Statues may have been identified based on inscriptions that identified where they were located in the lists. These inscriptions would have abbreviations that showcased the text's volume, the column of the work, and its number.

References 

Ancient Roman art
Art collections